Belait District (Jawi: دأيره بلأيت), or simply Belait, is the largest as well as the westernmost district in Brunei. The administrative town is Kuala Belait, located at the mouth of the Belait River. The district is commonly associated with the oil and gas industry of the country, mainly concentrated near the town of Seria.

Name 
Belait District is named after the Belait people, the main native inhabitants which traditionally settled near the mouth of the Belait River.

Geography 

The district borders the South China Sea to the north, the Bruneian district of Tutong to the east and the Malaysian state of Sarawak to the south and west.

The landscape of the district varies from the peat swamps and lowland forests near the coast to the montane rainforest in the interior parts of the district. The Belait Swamp Forest has been identified by BirdLife International as an Important Bird Area.

The Belait River flows through Belait and it is the longest river in Brunei. The Belait River, together with its tributaries drains the district – the Belait district roughly corresponds to the drainage basin of the Belait River.

Administration 

The district is administered by the Belait District Office, a government department under the Ministry of Home Affairs.

The district is subdivided into 8 mukims, namely:

 Mukim Bukit Sawat
 Mukim Kuala Balai
 Mukim Kuala Belait
 Mukim Labi
 Mukim Liang
 Mukim Melilas
 Mukim Seria
 Mukim Sukang

These are further subdivided into 83 Kampongs (Villages).

According to the Constitution, the district is to be represented in the Legislative Council, the state legislature, by up to 3 members. As of 2017, two members have been appointed to represent the district in the legislature.

Demographics 

Belait District is the second most populous district in Brunei. In terms of professed religions,  were Muslims,  were Christians,  were Buddhists, and  professed other than the aforementioned religions or irreligious.

The census also recorded 13,513 households living in 13,130 dwellings in the district.

In 2020, the district's population was estimated to have increased to 74,800.

The Belait people were traditionally the predominant native inhabitants. Other native ethnic groups include the Ibans and Penans. The Chinese are the main ethnic minority. There is also a large community of expatriates (Caucasians, Indians, Filipinos) mostly working with or associated with the oil and gas industry.

The district statistically has the lowest population density due to its large area. The population is mostly found in the minor area along the coast, in the vicinity of the district towns Kuala Belait and Seria. Majority of the area is unpopulated or very sparsely populated.

Education 

In 2019, there were 37 schools in Belait District under the Ministry of Education, out of which 24 were government and 13 were private. For the formal Islamic religious education which is under the Ministry of Religious Affairs, there were 19 religious schools ( of the country's total), employing 214 teachers and enrolling 4,847 students.

Transportation

Road

The district is connected by the Seria/Lumut bypass to the Muara-Tutong highway to the east and by the Rasau Bridge to Sungai Tujoh and Miri in the west. Roads near the coast, particularly in the urban areas of Kuala Belait, Seria and Sungai Liang are mostly surfaced and in good condition. Roads towards the interior – Labi, Melilas and Sukang – are partially surfaced, but may sustain damage from floods and landslides during the rainy season.

Rail
The Japanese built a wooden set of rail lines from Badas to the coast during the Second World War. This is no longer in use and has fallen into disrepair.

Ports and ferries
The Kuala Belait Port is one of the three ports in Brunei.  It is located on the Belait river and caters to small crafts.

A ferry service crosses the mouth of the Belait River linking Kuala Belait to Kampung Sungai Teraban. (This service has been ceased since 2005).

Air
There is one Anduki airfield, a suburb of Seria.  This is used mainly by Shell to transport company personnel to the offshore rigs and platforms. 

The interior villages of Sukang are visited by a regular flying medical service.

There are no commercial flights into and out of the district.

Economy
The Belait District, and Seria town in particular, is the heart of the oil and gas industry in Brunei. It has a large expatriate community, including many Dutch people. This is because Royal Dutch Shell has a major presence in the region.

There are two onshore oil and gas fields in the district – the large Seria Oil Field discovered in 1929 which is still producing hydrocarbons even today, and the smaller Rasau Field close to the town of Kuala Belait.  The Tali Field, which is an extension of the Seria Field is found in the coastal waters off Seria.  Further offshore lies the South-West Ampa, Fairley, Fairley Baram and Egret fields.

The petroleum produced is processed onshore in and around Seria, and the majority of it is exported.  Some of the oil is refined at the refinery in Seria for local consumption.  Natural gas from the fields is sent to the Brunei Liquefied Natural Gas Plant (BLNG) in Lumut, where it is cooled and liquefied.  This is exported via tankers to mainly Japan and Korea.

In the eastern part of the district, Liang is currently experiencing a major development with the establishment of SPARK, which is a  site developed to be a world-class petrochemical hub. The first major investment at SPARK is the USD450 million Methanol plant developed by the Brunei Methanol Company, a joint venture between Petroleum Brunei and two leading Japanese companies, Mitsubishi Chemical Holdings Corporation and Itochu Corporation. The plant was scheduled for completion in the first quarter of 2010.

References

External links 

  Belait District Office website

 
Districts of Brunei